Daniel Mackenzie (born 26 January 1935) is a Kenyan former sailor. He competed in the Finn event at the 1960 Summer Olympics.

References

External links
 

1935 births
Living people
Kenyan male sailors (sport)
Olympic sailors of Kenya
Sailors at the 1960 Summer Olympics – Finn
Place of birth missing (living people)